Czesław Idźkiewicz (October 21, 1889 – February 1, 1951), was a Polish landscape painter and art teacher. He was born in Różan, Poland to Piotr and Aleksandra née Magnuszewska.

Idźkiewicz was one of six children of the local organist Piotr Idźkiewicz. He went to school in Pułtusk nearby. Between 1908 and 1912 Idźkiewicz studied drawing and painting at the School of Fine Arts in Warsaw. At the same time he assisted in the painting of frescoes at Płock Cathedral. In 1912 he went to Antwerp to study at the Academie Royale de Beaux Arts, and in 1913 and 1914 he continued his studies in Kraków at the Academy of Fine Arts as a student of Józef Mehoffer and Józef Pankiewicz.

During the First World War, the principal painter of the Masovian Blessed Virgin Mary Cathedral in Płock, Władysław Drapiewski, was exiled, and Idźkiewicz continued the work on the royal chapel there on his own. He made a living as teacher of fine arts at the local preparatory school and subsequently obtained high-school educator certification. After the invasion of Poland in 1939, the entire collection of oil paintings by Idźkiewicz was stolen by the Nazis and shipped to Germany. It was never recovered; only a few of his artworks remain. He was arrested and sent to Dachau concentration camp near Munich. Idźkiewicz survived the war, and settled back in Płock. He worked as an educator until his unexpected death on February 1, 1951, at the age of 61.

Notes and references

Zienkiewicz H. (1963). "Czesław Idźkiewicz - Artysta malarz i wychowawca młodzieży", Notatki Płockie: 39-40 (Towarzystwo Naukowe Płockie).

1889 births
1951 deaths
20th-century Polish painters
20th-century Polish male artists
Polish landscape painters
Royal Academy of Fine Arts (Antwerp) alumni
People from Płock Governorate
Jan Matejko Academy of Fine Arts alumni
Academy of Fine Arts in Warsaw alumni
Polish schoolteachers
Polish male painters